Atlantic University is an American private non-profit distance education institution of higher and continuing education in Virginia Beach, Virginia.

Atlantic University may also refer to:
 Atlantic Technological University, a university in north-west Ireland
 Atlantic University Alliance, an association of three universities on the Atlantic coast of Ireland
 Atlantic University College, a university in Guaynabo, Puerto Rico
 Atlantic University School Of Medicine, a former offshore private medical school located in the Caribbean
 Atlantic University Sport, a regional membership association for universities in Atlantic Canada
 Atlantic International University, a distance-learning university in Hawaii originally incorporated as Atlantic University